Sarralbe (Lorraine Franconian: Alwe or Saaralwe) is a commune in the Moselle department in Grand Est in north-eastern France.

See also
 Communes of the Moselle department

References

External links 

 Official website

Communes of Moselle (department)